Pio Ferraris (19 May 1899 – 5 February 1957) was an Italian footballer who played as a forward. He competed for Italy in the men's football tournament at the 1920 Summer Olympics.

References

1899 births
1957 deaths
Italian footballers
Italy international footballers
Olympic footballers of Italy
Footballers at the 1920 Summer Olympics
Footballers from Turin
Association football forwards
Juventus F.C. players
Casale F.B.C. players
Savona F.B.C. players